Émilie Loit and Katarina Srebotnik were the defending champions, but none competed this year.

Eva Birnerová and Jarmila Gajdošová won the title by defeating Yan Zi and Zheng Jie 0–6, 6–4, 6–2 in the final.

Seeds

Draw

Draw

References

External links
 Official results archive (ITF)
 Official results archive (WTA)

Doubles
Nordea Nordic Light Open
Nordic